Girouxville is a village in northern Alberta, Canada.

History 
The community has the name of the local Giroux family, being named after Father Henri Giroux, a Roman Catholic missionary appointed by Émile Grouard. In 1951, Girouxville was incorporated as a village.

Demographics 

The population of the Village of Girouxville according to its 2017 municipal census is 289.

In the 2016 Census of Population conducted by Statistics Canada, the Village of Girouxville recorded a population of 219 living in 107 of its 130 total private dwellings, a  change from its 2011 population of 266.

Notable people 
Singer and actor Robert Goulet lived in Girouxville for a portion of his teenage years.

See also 
List of communities in Alberta
List of villages in Alberta

References 

1951 establishments in Alberta
Villages in Alberta